Enkhtaivany Ariunbold (born 8 October 1995) is a Mongolian judoka.

He is the bronze medallist of the 2021 Judo Grand Slam Paris in the -60 kg category.

References

External links
 

1995 births
Living people
Mongolian male judoka
21st-century Mongolian people
20th-century Mongolian people